Baddeckenstedt is a Samtgemeinde ("collective municipality") in the district of Wolfenbüttel, in Lower Saxony, Germany.
Its seat is in the village Baddeckenstedt.

The Samtgemeinde Baddeckenstedt consists of the following municipalities:

 Baddeckenstedt
 Burgdorf 
 Elbe 
 Haverlah 
 Heere 
 Sehlde

References

Wolfenbüttel (district)